The Romanian Ice Hockey Federation is the governing body that oversees ice hockey in Romania.

National teams
  Romania men's national ice hockey team
  Romania men's national junior ice hockey team
  Romania men's national under-18 ice hockey team
  Romania women%27s national ice hockey team
  Romania women's national under-18 ice hockey team

References

External links
Official website
Romania at IIHF.com

Ice hockey in Romania
Ice hockey
International Ice Hockey Federation members
Ice hockey governing bodies in Europe